Senator Pederson may refer to:

Dwite Pedersen (born 1941), Nebraska State Senate
Jamie Pedersen (born 1968), Washington State Senate
Don Pederson (1928–2019), Nebraska State Senate
John Pederson (Minnesota politician) (born 1968), Minnesota State Senate
Roland Pederson (born 1950), Oklahoma State Senate

See also
Senator Petersen (disambiguation)
Senator Peterson (disambiguation)